Kashmar County (Ŝahrestāne Kāŝmar) is in Razavi Khorasan province, Iran. The capital of the county is the city of Kashmar. At the 2006 census, the county's population was 146,536 in 39,554 households. The following census in 2011 counted 157,149 people in 46,726 households. At the 2016 census, the county's population was 168,664 in 52,778 households. Kuhsorkh District was separated from the county on 9 September 2018 to become Kuhsorkh County.

Administrative divisions

The population history of Kashmar County's administrative divisions over three consecutive censuses is shown in the following table. The latest census shows two districts, five rural districts, and two cities.

References

 

Counties of Razavi Khorasan Province